Delta was an orienteering club in western Uusimaa of Finland. It formed in 1992 when three clubs started with joint teams and activities. Delta later dissolved in 2012. Hiidenkiertäjät then promised to keep training the best runners. 

The initial participating clubs were Hiidenkiertäjät from Lohja, Karkki-Rasti from Karkkila, and Rasti-Vihti from Vihti.

Results 
Heikka and Novikov went first.

In 2012, the club's final year, they placed fourth in the Jukola relay.

Members 
Other runners for the club were Jani Lakanen, and Jarkko Huovila.

References 

Orienteering clubs in Finland
Sports clubs established in 1992
Sports clubs disestablished in 2012